Kaweco is a German brand of writing implements, originally introduced by the Heidelberg Pen Company for its dip pens line in 1889. Kaweco became a public limited company in 1921, then being taken over by the Knust Woringen and Grube company (KWG), after Kaweco went bankrupt in 1930.

In 1994, the Gutberlet GmbH, a cosmetics company based in Nuremberg, acquired the rights to the "Kaweco" name. The core competency is the production and distribution of fine writing instruments including accessories.

Current products under the Kaweco brand include fountain, rollerball, digital and dip pens, and mechanical pencils.

History 
The Kaweco brand originated in 1883, when the "Heidelberger Federhalter Fabrik" ("Heidelberg Dip Pen Factory") was founded by the gentlemen Luce and Enßlen in Heidelberg. Wooden dip pens and fountain pens were produced, while gold nibs manufactured by A. Morton & Co. were imported from New York.

The businessmen Heinrich Koch and Rudolph Weber took over the dip pen factory in 1889 and set-up a new production facility in Handschuhsheim, right outside of Heidelberg. The products were marked with the brand names Perkeo, Omega, and Kaweco and were stamped with the initials HF, which stands for Heidelberger Federhalterfabrik (Heidelberg dip pen factory).

Shortly after, the brand name Kaweco became the company name under which the products are still distributed today.

In the year 1909 the first Kaweco safety fountain pen was developed and patented under D.R.G.M 224101, and was strongly advertised. Due to high demand, the distribution of Kaweco writing instruments was expanded.

Kaweco opened subsidiaries in Berlin, Paris, Zurich and Vienna, as well as agencies in many countries all over the World. A 1911 catalog shows a wide range of fountain pens and filling systems. Here it was mentioned for the first time that Kaweco is a pocket fountain pen for ladies, officers, and sportsmen. It is the birth year of the Kaweco Sport.

In 1914 Kaweco assumed control over the former parts provider A. Morton & Co., which at the time was the oldest gold nib factory in New York. These assets and equipment were moved to Heidelberg and the production of Kaweco's own gold nibs began.

In 1921 Kaweco was reorganized as a PLC (public limited company). Kaweco had an approximate annual production of 130,000 fountain pens and employed 600 people. Lever fountain pens were added to the production.

In 1929 fountain pen factory Knust, Woringen & Grube from Wiesloch (Aurumia brand) purchased the Kaweco company name, machines, stock, and patents. Friedrich Grube would lead the company for the next 30 years. In this year the "KA WE CO" Logo, which is divided into three parts, was developed. This logo is still used today and can be found as a branding on many different products.

During World War II, a lack of raw materials and manpower nearly led to a complete production shut down. On October 30, 1945, several months after the end of the war, the county commissioner gave permission for Kaweco to resume business.

On May 5, 1960, Friedrich Grube Sr. died at the age of 63. His son Wilhelm takes over the company. Under Wilhelm Grube's leadership the design of the product range was modernized and made to look slimmer and streamlined.

In 1971 Kaweco launched the Sport set, which included a special jewelry pendant, as a licensed writing instrument of the 20th Olympic Games in Munich. Large companies valued the Kaweco Sport as an advertising medium.

In 1994, cosmetics company Gutberlet GmbH, based in Nuremberg, registered the rights to the Kaweco name and brand. A new Sport series, inspired by the design of 1935, was launched. Pocket writing instruments were introduced to the market as fountain pens, rollerball pens, ball pens, mechanical pencils and clutch pencils.

The company Diplomat became the worldwide exclusive sales partner with Kaweco, however in 1999 Diplomat was taken over by Herlitz, leading to an end of this partnership. Since then Kaweco has been increasing its worldwide distribution independently by working closely with domestic partners. Today Kaweco products are available in more than 50 countries.

Company 
The success of Kaweco today can be largely attributed to inspiration through historical products of earlier periods. The brand's history and the nostalgic design of its products are deeply intertwined with modern technology.

Besides the core business, Kaweco continues to successfully establish itself on the market with co-brandings. Individual pen designs are created with cooperation partners like Supreme New York, Microsoft, NOMOS Glashütte, Oris., and many others.

Bibliography 
Timo Teufert: Der Federhalter schrieb in Heidelberg Geschichte. In: Rhein-Neckar-Zeitung. 16. Dezember 2008.
Andreas Lambrou, Stefan Wallrafen: Füllfederhalter - Ein Überblick über die Entstehungsgeschichte und die wichtigsten internationalen Marken. Heyne-Verlag, München 1992, .
Gerhard Brandl, Michael Gutberlet: Kaweco - Gutberlet crossing Kaweco. verlag Regionalkultur, Ubstadt-Weiher, 2017.
Andreas Lambrou: Fountain Pens of the world. Classic Pens Ltd., Epping, 1995.
Andreas Lambrou: Fountain Pens - Vintage and modern. Classic Pens Ltd., Epping, 1989.
Michael Gutberlet: Kaweco: ein Stück Geschichte aus der (Schreibgeräte-) Industrie - Sonderanfertigungen 1924 - 1928. Nürnberg, 2016.
Thomas Neureither: Seit 100 Jahren - Füllhalter aus Handschuhsheim. Heidelberg, 1997.

References

External links 

 

German brands
Fountain pen and ink manufacturers
German companies established in 1883
Companies based in Heidelberg
Manufacturing companies established in 1883